Kim Sang-jin (born August 9, 1967) is a South Korean film director, screenwriter and producer. He directed the hit comedies Attack the Gas Station (1999), Kick the Moon (2001) and Jail Breakers (2002).

Filmography
Who Saw the Dragon's Claws?  (1991) - assistant director
Teenage Love Song (1991) - script editor, assistant director
I Want to Live Just Until 20 Years Old (1992) - screenwriter, assistant director
Life Isn't a Multiple Choice Test (1992) - actor
Mister Mama (1992) - assistant director
Two Cops (1993) - assistant director
How to Top My Wife (1994) - screenwriter, assistant director
Millions in My Account (1995) - director
The Rules of a Gangster  (1996) - director
Two Cops 3 (1998) - director
Attack the Gas Station (1999) - director
Last Present (2001) - executive producer, actor
Kick the Moon (2001) - director, actor
Jail Breakers (2002) - director
Spring Breeze (2003) - planner
Ghost House (2004) - director
Another Public Enemy (2005) - assistant editor
King and the Clown (2005) - investor
Lost in Love (2006) - investor
Kidnapping Granny K (2007) - director, executive producer
Attack the Gas Station 2 (2010) - director, actor
Pitch High (2011) - director, executive producer
Three Summer Nights (2015) - director

References

External links
 
 
 

South Korean film directors
South Korean screenwriters
South Korean film producers
Hanyang University alumni
1967 births
Living people